A bawbee was a Scottish sixpence. The word means a debased copper coin, valued at six pence Scots (equal at the time to an English half-penny), issued from the reign of James V of Scotland to the reign of William II of Scotland. They were hammered until 1677, when they were produced upon screw presses.

Issues
The bawbee was introduced by James V in 1538, valued at sixpence. These carry his 'I5' monogram flanking a crowned thistle, and a large saltire on the reverse with a central crown. There were also a smaller half bawbee and a quarter bawbee. Around the year 1544 James V's widow Mary of Guise minted bawbees at Stirling Castle, with an 'MR' cipher on the obverse and the cross potent with crosslets of Lorraine on the reverse. The first bawbees of Mary, Queen of Scots, issued by the mint at Holyroodhouse in Edinburgh carried the cinquefoil emblems of the Regent Arran.

The bawbee of King Charles II was a copper coin with the reverse inscription Nemo me impune lacessit ("No one provokes me with impunity"), although the last word on these coins was spelled "Lacesset". This motto is still in use today on the edge of some circulating one pound coins.
The motto is around a crowned thistle and is followed by the date. This coin was also valued at six pence Scots or half an English penny.

Etymology
According to Brewer's Dictionary of Phrase and Fable,

This Master of the Mint, appointed by James V, was responsible for the introduction of a silver coin valued at six, later three, pence Scots, which was named after his estate. Sillebawby was a farm in the parish of Burntisland in Fife, a moorland portion of the farm of Balbie (pronounced 'bawbee'). Its name takes various forms throughout its recorded history: Sybbable (1328), Slebalbe (1328 and 1458), Selybawbey (1517) are some early examples. The later examples Silverbabie (1642), Silver-baby (1654) and Silverbarton (1828 and current) may have arisen from a nickname marking the connection to the silver coin.

Brewer's Dictionary of Phrase and Fable also gives an alternative etymology, and states its origin from "French, bas billon, (debased copper money)", but this is a kind of speculative folk-etymology.

Literary references
The bawbee was metaphorically used for a fortune by Sir Alexander Boswell, the son of the more famous James Boswell, the biographer of Samuel Johnson. It occurs in the song of Jennie’s Bawbee:

Sir Alexander took the hint of his song from a much older one:

Brewer's Dictionary lists "Jenny's Bawbee" as meaning a "marriage portion".

After 1707 the Pound Scots was phased out. England and Scotland then shared what had been the English coinage, and in Scotland the term "bawbee" took on the meaning of a halfpenny, as can be seen in the poem Lament for Ancient Edinburgh by James Ballantine published in 1856 (see Luckenbooths article). The word was still current in the 20th century and continues to be used to refer to bawbee baps or cakes in Aberdeen (i.e. low-priced baps). A popular song, "The Crookit Bawbee", was recorded by The Alexander Brothers and Kenneth McKellar amongst others, and the tune remains a staple for Scottish country dance band music. The song has a rich suitor asking why his "bright gowd" and "hame... in bonnie Glenshee" are being turned down, the lady referring to a laddie when she was a young "bairnie", and her heart "Was gi'en him lang-syne, for this crookit bawbee." Inevitably the rich suitor turns out to be the laddie returned to his love.

The bawbee is referred to in the popular Scots song "Coulter's Candy":

Kirkmahoe

The tale is that the people of Kirkmahoe were so poor, they could not afford to put any meat into their broth. A 'cute cobbler invested all his money in buying four sheep-shanks, and when a neighbour wanted to make mutton broth, for the payment of one halfpenny the cobbler would "plump" one of the sheep-shanks into the boiling water, and give it a "wallop" or whisk round. He then wrapped it in a cabbage-leaf and took it home. This was called a gustin bone, and was supposed to give a rich "gust" to the broth. The cobbler found his gustin bone very profitable.

Skipping rhyme

See also

Bodle
Plack
Pound Scots
Scottish coinage

Footnotes

References
 Holmes, Nicholas. Scottish Coins: A History of Small Change in Scotland. NMS Publishing (1998) 
 MacKay, Charles. A Dictionary of Lowland Scotch (1888)
 Brewer's Dictionary of Phrase and Fable

External links
 Bawbee at Brewers Phrase and Fable

Coins of Scotland
Scots language